How I Ended This Summer (translit. Kak ya provyol etim letom) is a 2010 Russian drama film directed by Alexei Popogrebski. It was critically acclaimed and garnered several awards and nominations; it was in the competition for the Golden Bear at the 60th Berlin International Film Festival.

Plot
Meteorology student Pavel "Pasha" Danilov (Grigoriy Dobrygin) is spending the summer as an intern at an isolated, Soviet-era weather station on a remote Arctic island with only the older, experienced geophysicist Sergei Gulybin (Sergei Puskepalis) for company. Their sole job is to collect the weather and tide statistics every four hours on antiquated equipment, which they do in shifts, and report the readings by radio to the state meteorology center. Pasha is respectful and friendly, but he is afraid of the gruff Sergei, who is condescending to him, as he resents Pasha's temporary stay and is jealous that he knows how to operate their only computer.

Sergei takes the boat on an unauthorized fishing trip for a few days, and tells Pasha not to mention this. When the radio operator urgently requests to speak with Sergei,  Pasha dutifully makes up excuses why he cannot come on the radio. Eventually Pasha is told to take down a radiogram that Sergei's wife and young son have been "gravely injured" in an accident, although it is apparent they've been killed. He is told that a ship Academic Obruchev is headed to get them and instructed to simply give Sergei the message and then "leave him alone." The sad news keeps Pasha awake, but when he does sleep he oversleeps; the data goes unrecorded. Seeing Sergei's boat, he hastily grabs the logbook to fill in fake numbers, and in doing so knocks his radiogram under the desk. When Sergei comes ashore with the trout, he is in a good mood. He tells Pasha a warm story about his wife craving salted trout during her pregnancy. Pasha starts to say something, but Sergei interrupts and teaches him how to properly fillet a fish.

Once inside, Sergei quickly figures out that the Pasha made up the numbers in the log and explodes in anger, dragging Pasha inside and berating him. He tells him that the station has been continuously occupied since 1935, and that no matter how bad the conditions got, never had anyone just faked the numbers out of sheer laziness, and that now all their work is worthless. He accuses Pasha of being a "tourist" in the Arctic in order to write a pointless essay, "How I Ended This Summer" (a play on the clichéd "How I Spent My Summer Vacation.") Sergei tells him an intimidating  story about the time one geophysicist apparently killed the other due to their strained relationship.

The frightened Pasha does not tell Sergei about his family and temporarily sabotages the radio. When Sergei leaves to get more trout, Pasha is told that the ship is stuck in ice, but that a helicopter will instead come before the weather worsens. Pasha, carrying a rifle, heads to the lagoon to meet the helicopter. Upon hearing the rotors of the helicopter, Pasha lights a flare, but the pilot cannot see the flare due to heavy fog and flies away. Pasha then notices bear pawprints. Following the tracks with his eyes, he sees the distinct white shape of a polar bear. He runs a short distance, and notices that the bear is chasing him. He flees, and begins to descend a steep embankment, and subsequently trips.

Pasha wakes up in Sergei's boat. As they disembark, Pasha tries to confess to Sergei that he needs to tell him something but Sergei ignores him. Pasha finally blurts out to Sergei that his family is dead. Sergei turns around and comes toward him, and Pasha, frightened and with an injured leg, falls to the ground. Thinking Sergei is going to attack him, Pasha fires at him but misses. He then gets up and runs away while Sergei picks up his gun and fires at him, and then keeps shooting into the air.

Pasha takes up residence in an old abandoned cabin. He wakes up to hear Sergei outside and hides, still afraid. Sergei calls to him and says he wants to talk to him. Sergei, who is carrying his rifle, hears Pasha step on something that makes a large cracking sound. Thinking Pasha fired at him, he fires his own rifle. The terrified Pasha runs away.

Pasha, freezing, huddles by an old radioisotope thermoelectric generator to keep warm before realizing he has exposed himself to radiation. He sneaks into the cabin when Sergei is away and tries to contact the main station for help but cannot reach anyone.  Starving, he steals Sergei's fish and nearly chokes to death on a fishbone. He screams and curses Sergei. He hangs fish up on the isotope beacon; he later sneaks back into the cabin and replaces Sergei's stash of fish with the contaminated fish.

One night Sergei sees the disheveled Pasha looking in the cabin window watching him eat the fish. He signals to Pasha to come inside, and then invites him to sit down and have some fish. He says the Academic Obruchev made it through the ice after all and will be there in three days. Pasha confesses that the fish has been contaminated. Sergei says nothing, but goes to vomit up the fish he has just eaten. Pasha checks the cupboard and sees Sergei has eaten all of the contaminated fish. Sergei returns and says only that they don't have to tell anyone what has happened. 3 days later, two men help secure the broken thermoelectric generator to a helicopter, which then flies away to the Academic, which has reached the island.

Sergei tells Pasha he plans to stay on the island. Pasha threatens to tell what has happened to force Sergei to get medical help. Sergei grabs Pasha, and hugs him, telling him that he needs to stay on the island alone.

Cast
 Grigoriy Dobrygin as Pavel Danilov
 Sergei Puskepalis as Sergei Gulybin
 Igor Csernyevics as Safronov (voice)
 Ilya Sobolev as Volodya (voice)
 Artyom Tsukanov as Stas (voice)

Production

Conception 
Alexei Popogrebski stated in making the film, ever since he was a child, he has been fascinated by the diaries of polar explorers. Their ability to come to terms with the monstrous vastness of time and space amazes him. The story of two men living and working in complete isolation slowly developed inside of him over the years. After completing two features, Popogrebsky felt he was ready for this challenge.

Filming 
The main location for filming was the Valkarkay polar station on the Chukchi Sea in Arctic Russia.  Alexei Popogrebski intended it was clear that the film had to merge entirely with the actual, real setting. He did some research and found the Valkarkai polar station on the northernmost tip of Chukotka. Popogrebsky states in his interview with the Russian Magazine: Action, “if you look at the map, it is literally the end of the world”. Popograbsky and his team went there for location scouting in 2007 and fell in love with the place. When the group returned at the station in June, the ocean was still covered with ice; in the last days of filming it snowed and young ice began to form. It snowed for the first time on 3 August. The average temperature in these summer months was 5 degrees. The Foggy Station, where one of the most intense scenes of the film was shot, is located at the northernmost geographical point of mainland Chukotka - Cape Shelagsky. In total, five polar bears lived in the vicinity of the shooting site: the first appeared a bear with two adult bears, then a mother male (he was the one who "starred" in the film), and at the end of the shooting - a young bear who tried to have lunch with the director and cameraman. Throughout the film-making process, the film was shot chronologically, maximum jumping over one scene.

Casting 
After Popogrebski came back from the location scouting, he proudly showed this place on the map to Sergey Puskepalis, who starred in his previous movie, Simple Things, and for whom he wrote one of the two parts in the new script. Puskepalis looked at it and then stated matter-of-factly: ‘I lived near there for nine years’. When Puskepalis was a child, his parents worked at a nuclear plant in Chukotka. Thanks to that, Sergey, who plays the seasoned polar meteorologist, fitted in entirely with the local workers from the very start. Popogrebski’s plan was for the actors to wear their protagonists’ clothes, live their lives, and follow their routine a hundred percent of the time.

Themes 
The landscape and nature themself seems to become one of the main characters of this film, capturing landscapes that are striking but never aestheticised, from fog-steeped valleys to murderous rocky cliffs. The film unfolds in the remotest Arctic regions of Russia's Far East, where the personal conflict between the film's two protagonists develops as they understand the nature of their different conflicts with the looming mountains and rough seascapes by which they are isolated. As Popogrebski puts it himself, “All of us being city dwellers, we tell the story from the point of view of the younger character whose life experience is much closer to ours. However, in making this film, our effort was to become subjects to the nature of extreme North, to let go of rigid pre-planned concepts and be open and attentive to what it could offer us. And it had a lot to offer.”

Another theme of this film is the generational divides of Russian society today. The film establishes its two-character dynamic, a story of two personal (and incompatible) time-and-space scaled, using a psychologically tense narrative to explore the relationship  between  linear  historical  time  and  timeless.The older character, Sergei (Sergei Puskipalis) relies on old methods of collecting and transmitting meteorological data. He records water and air temperatures and solar activity using what should be described as analogue methods: thermometers, barometers, as well as a pair of Wellington boots  as he wades into the icy waters of the Arctic Ocean. His younger counterpart, Pavel (Grigorii Dobrygin), fully relies on modern digital technology—the computer. Perhaps in contemporary meteorological practice traditional and computerized methods are used conjointly; however, the director makes a clear point about the characters’ difference in the use of technology.

Reception
How I Ended This Summer received positive reviews overall. How I Ended This Summer has an approval rating of 79% on review aggregator website Rotten Tomatoes, based on 43 reviews, and an average rating of 6.47/10. On Metacritic, the film has a weighted average score of 74 out of 100, based on 6 critics, indicating  "generally favorable reviews".

Critic Philip French of The Guardian praised the film, calling it a "tense allegory about modern Russia." He said Dobrygin and Puskepalis rightfully deserved their awards for their performances in the isolated setting, writing that "They almost seem like the last survivors in a post-apocalyptic world" and that he sees "Sergei and Pavel as representing different sides of Putin's Russia, one shaped by older traditional ways, the other struggling to discover a new set of values." Tim Robey of The Daily Telegraph gave it four stars, writing, that the director Popogrebsky "delivers a Tarkovskian parable about nuclear horror which also functions as a sustained and nail-biting psychological thriller."

Awards

References

External links

 

2010 films
2010 drama films
Russian drama films
2010s Russian-language films
Films directed by Alexei Popogrebski
Best Film, London Film Festival winners
Silver Bear for outstanding artistic contribution